Challis may refer to:

People
 Challis (surname)

Places
 Challis, Idaho
 Challis, New Zealand

Other uses
 Challis (crater), a crater on Earth's moon
 Challis railway station
 "Challis", a song by American heavy metal band Dio off their 2000 studio album Magica
 Challis (fabric), a printed woven fabric.

See also
 Chalice, a cup used in religious ceremonies
 Chalise, a surname